Chlorocypha hasta is a species of damselfly in family Chlorocyphidae. It is endemic to Tanzania.

Sources

Chlorocyphidae
Insects of Tanzania
Endemic fauna of Tanzania
Insects described in 1960
Taxonomy articles created by Polbot
Taxobox binomials not recognized by IUCN